Ada of Scotland (died after 1206), also known as Ada of Huntingdon, was a member of the Scottish royal house who became Countess of Holland by marriage to Floris III, Count of Holland.

Life
Ada was born in Scotland, the daughter of Henry of Huntingdon (1114–1152) and Ada de Warenne (died ). Henry was the son of King David I of Scotland and Maud, Countess of Huntingdon, and Ada's siblings include the Scottish kings Malcolm IV, William the Lion, and David of Scotland, Earl of Huntingdon.

Countess of Holland 
In 1162 she was asked for her hand in marriage to Floris III, Count of Holland (–1190) by the Abbot of Egmond, Holland. Together, the Abbot and Ada traveled back to Holland, where the wedding ceremony occurred, probably in Egmond, on 28 August 1162. Ada received the County of Ross in the Scottish Highlands as a wedding gift.

Ada was not actively involved in the governance of the County of Holland but was occasionally mentioned in documents. Floris, her husband was a loyal ally of the Holy Roman Emperor, Frederick I, and often went with him into battle. Dutch chronicler Melis Stoke states that she supported her son in the war with William of Cleves during the War of Succession.  In addition, Ada is known to have read Latin. Ada died after 1206 and was probably buried in the Abbey of Middelburg, to which she had already made donations of £64.

Ada and Floris had about 11 children, of whom some died young

Issue

 Ada (died after 1205), married 1176 Margrave Otto I of Brandenburg
 Margaret (died after 1203), married 1182 Count Dietrich IV of Cleves
 Dirk VII, Count of Holland
 William I, Count of Holland
 Floris (died 1210), bishop of Glasgow
 Baldwin (died 1204)
 Robert
 Beatrix
 Elisabeth
 Hedwig
 Agnes (died 1228), Abbess at Rijnsburg

References

External links
Ada of Scotland, Online Dictionary of Dutch Women

12th-century Scottish women
13th-century Scottish women
House of Dunkeld
Year of birth uncertain
Year of death unknown
Scottish princesses
12th-century Scottish people
13th-century Scottish people